Nesebar is a Bulgarian municipal association football club based in Nesebar, Burgas Province, that competes in the Third League, the third tier of Bulgarian football.

Nesebar have played in the second tier or below for the majority of the club’s history, up until 2004 when the team promoted to A Group for the first time. Their spell in the Bulgarian elite lasted only one season however, as they were relegated. Nesebar is yet to return to the first tier.

History
The club was established in 1946 under the name Chernomorets Nesebar. After 1949 team is divided to Dynamo and Cherveno Zname. In 1957 the company for physical culture and sport Chernomorets is refounded with the team. From 1979 to 2001 the team is called Slanchev Bryag. Еxception are the years from 1993 to 1996 when the team is called PFC Nesebar. From 2001 team is called Nesebar, as from 2012 team is OFC (Municipal football club).

Nesebar won promotion to the A Group during the 2003–04 season—the only time the club has played in the top level of Bulgarian football—with a third-place finish. In their first season in the top flight they were relegated after only five wins.

In 2009–10 season, Nesebar finished second in the B Group and qualified for the promotion play-off, but were defeated by Akademik Sofia 2–1. Two years later, they slipped into the third division.

Historical names

Honours
Bulgarian V AFG: 
 Winners (4): 1989–90, 1999–2000, 2002–03, 2015–16	

A RFG: 
 Winners (2): 1973–74, 1977–78

Cup of Bulgarian Amateur Football League
 Winners (1): 2016

Current squad 
As of 1 September 2019

For recent transfers, see Transfers summer 2018 and Transfers winter 2018–19.

Season to season

Seasons in A Group: 1
Seasons in B Group (now Second League): 25
Seasons in V Group: 18
Seasons in A Regional Group: 8

League positions

References

External links 
 Nesebar at bgclubs.eu

Nesebar
Nesebar
Nesebar